Genola may refer to:

Places
Italy
 Genola, Piedmont, a comune in the Province of Cuneo

United States
 Genola, Minnesota, a city in Morrison County
 Genola, Utah, a town in Utah County